Sutton-on-Sea (originally Sutton in the Marsh or Sutton le Marsh) is a village in the East Lindsey district of Lincolnshire, England, beside a long sandy beach along the North Sea. The village is part of the civil parish of Mablethorpe and Sutton. The amenities include a post office, public houses, a general store, a hotel and a paddling pool on the sea front. The southern part of the village is known as Sandilands.

History
At very low tides it is possible to view the remains of an ancient mixed forest on the beaches of Mablethorpe and Sutton on Sea. It was submerged by rising sea levels about 3000 years ago. The first scholar to publish an analysis of this submarine forest – and of any submarine forest – was the Portuguese botanist and polymath, José Francisco Correia da Serra, who surveyed it in 1796, when he visited the area in the company of the distinguished naturalist Sir Joseph Banks.

Sea flooding was a periodic problem during the Middle Ages. The last flood was the North Sea flood of January 1953, when a ten-foot storm surge broke through the flood defences.

The church, which is a Grade II listed building, is dedicated to Saint Clement. It was built in 1818–19 on a new site, after the previous church was destroyed by the sea.

Railway influence
The Alford and Sutton Tramway ran from Alford town to Sutton-on-Sea on rails set into the road. It opened in 1884 and closed five years later.

Sutton-on-Sea railway station opened as part of the Sutton and Willoughby Railway in 1886, which connected the town southwards, enabling through holiday trains from the industrial Midlands and North of England to reach the resort. In 1888 the line was extended to Mablethorpe. The railway connection encouraged a huge development in Sutton; between July and December 1889 40,328 passengers were carried to Sutton, 1,700 more than to Mablethorpe in the same period.

The railway lines in the district all closed on 5 October 1970.

Harbour plans
Sutton le Marsh (as it was then called) was considered to be an ideal location for a new fishing harbour. The Sutton & Willoughby Railway & Dock Company was authorised by Parliament on 28 July 1884 to build docks at Sutton, and to make a railway branch line to the main line at Willoughby. Authorised share capital was £60,000. The company was unable to raise the capital it needed, and it built only the railway line and not the dock.

In December 1886 a fresh concern, the North Sea Fisheries Harbour & Dock Company promoted the scheme again, and it asked the Great Northern Railway for financial assistance. The GNR was the dominant network in the area, and at that time rail conveyance of fresh fish to the centres of population was good business for railway companies. Grimsby was well served by a rival railway company, the Manchester, Sheffield and Lincolnshire Railway and the North Sea Fisheries company hoped that the GNR would fund the construction. However the GNR saw that the dock expenditure would be very heavy, and would not pay, and it refused.

The idea of a new harbour was revived in 1891, when the Lancashire, Derbyshire and East Coast Railway was authorised to build a railway line across the country to Sutton. Sutton was preferred to Boston, which was also considered, because land was available at Sutton, and Trinity House said that Sutton was the best site for a port of refuge on that coast. This was a huge project, and once again the company was unable to raise the money it needed; it built a small portion of the planned railway, and did not start the harbour works. Eventually the company became owned by the Great Central Railway, which developed Immingham Docks from 1906.

Education
Sutton on Sea Community Primary School was built in 1862 as a National School, becoming a board school in 1887, and a council school in 1903. It became a primary school in 1964, and has been called the Sutton on Sea Community Primary School since 1999.

Demography

Retired status as to adult majority
When the 2011 census was taken, Sutton on Sea had two electoral wards, North and South. The south ward ranked, out of all 8570 nationwide, 2nd by proportion of retirees in the total population, and the north ward ranked 6th. Between these, ranking 3rd, was neighbouring Trusthorpe and Mablethorpe South, since which time the ward has been redrawn as Mablethorpe). The proportion on average, nationally was 15.6%; in the three wards mentioned the proportions respectively were: 45.5% retired, 41.1% retired and 42.1% retired.

References
References

Notes

External links

The website for Sutton on Sea, Sandilands and Trusthorpe
The largest selection of old and new Sutton on Sea photographs
Photo gallery for Mablethorpe, Trusthorpe, Sutton-On-Sea with images old and new
Sutton on Sea resort page on Lincolnshire Seaside website
Sutton-on-Sea Community Primary School
The Rotary Club of Alford and Mablethorpe (meeting in Alford and Sutton on Sea)

Seaside resorts in England
Villages in Lincolnshire
Populated coastal places in Lincolnshire
Beaches of Lincolnshire
East Lindsey District